Valentin Atanasov (born 7 May 1961) in Kjustendil, Bulgaria  is a retired Bulgarian sprinter who specialized in the 100 metres. He won three medals at the European Indoor Championships.

His personal best time was 10.15 seconds, achieved in August 1982 in Sofia. This ranks him second among Bulgarian 100 metres sprinters, only behind Petar Petrov.

He also competed in the bobsleigh at the 1992 Winter Olympics and the 1994 Winter Olympics.

Achievements

References

External links
 

1961 births
Living people
Bulgarian male sprinters
World Athletics Championships athletes for Bulgaria
Bulgarian male bobsledders
Olympic bobsledders of Bulgaria
Bobsledders at the 1992 Winter Olympics
Bobsledders at the 1994 Winter Olympics
People from Kyustendil
Sportspeople from Kyustendil Province